Walsingham House School is a private girls' school founded in 1940 and located in a former palace of the Maharajah of Kutch in South Bombay, India. The school is managed by the Mittal Group, and is affiliated to the ICSE.

History
The school was founded in 1940 by Mrs. Tree and Mrs. Adcock at Oomer Park. Mrs. Tree was the first school principal. In 1950 it moved to Breach Candy, and in 1965 it moved to its current premises which is currently located on L.J Road (Nepean Sea Road). The school is now at Dariya Mahal.

Since 1970, the school is managed by the Mittal Trust, and serving approximately 1,500 students and 103 faculty and staff members.

Activities
The school offers extracurricular activities such as basketball, badminton, volleyball, table-tennis, athletics, long-jump, throwball, discus, javelin, tug-of-war, dance, bharatnatyam, craft, and canvas painting. It has events like debates, dramatics, interhouse quizzes and interhouse elocutions.

Historically they have hosted events for students in order to get involved in local civic projects, such as the 2015 Banganga Tank cleaning project.

Motto
The school motto is In Felicitate Laboramus which is Latin for 'In Happiness We Work'.

School anthem
Here we come from every nation,
For our work and for our plays,
Sure to meet each situation,
Whether days be bright or grey.

You will always find us ready,
With a willing helping hand,
To our comrades we'll be steady,
We the children from each land.

Happy here in joyful singing,
We are one large family,
And this message we are bringing,
Let us ever friendly be.

Dear Walsingham this pledge we offer,
Now and in our future days,
To keep this spirit we'll endeavour,
And encourage peaceful days.

Notable alumni
Dhruvi Acharya, artist
 Kalpana Morparia, banker
 Tarana Raja, actress, dancer, television anchor, and radio host.

References

Private schools in Mumbai
Girls' schools in Maharashtra
Educational institutions established in 1940
1940 establishments in India